The women's 3 metre springboard, also reported as springboard diving, was one of four diving events on the diving at the 1948 Summer Olympics programme.

The competition was held on Saturday 31 July, on Monday 2 August, and on Tuesday 3 August. It was split into two sets of dives:

Compulsory dives
Divers performed four pre-chosen dives (from different categories) – a running straight header forward, backward header with pike, running straight isander-half gainer reverse dive, and backward spring and forward dive with pike. 
Facultative dives
Divers performed four dives of their choice (from different categories and different from the compulsory).

Sixteen divers from eight nations competed.

Results

References

Sources
  
 

Women
1948
1948 in women's diving
Div